Sodkuiyeh (also Romanized as Sodkū’īyeh; also known as Sotkūeeyeh) is a village in Horjand Rural District, Kuhsaran District, Ravar County, Kerman Province, Iran. At the 2006 census, its population was 11, in 4 families.

References 

Populated places in Ravar County